Seaman's Hut is an alpine hut and memorial located in New South Wales, Australia. It was built following the death of two skiers, W. Laurie Seaman and Evan Hayes in 1928. Seaman's family built the hut to provide shelter to future users of the park, in order to prevent recurrence of a similar tragedy, which has since done.

Seaman's hut is built primarily of stone with plank flooring. The interior consists of two rooms and a foyer for firewood storage.   

It is located on Etheridge Range, 6 km from Charlottes Pass on the road to Mount Kosciusko.

History
The site on Etheridge Range was chosen by W. H. Seaman, to build a shelter in memory of his son Laurie Seaman, who died of exposure in 1928 at the same location. The hut was officially opened by Mr F. Chaffey and a small group, on a Friday 17 May 1929.

Access
Foot, skis or Mountain bike along road from Charlotte Pass (closed to vehicle access), or walking/skiing trails from Thredbo or Guthega.

Usage
This hut is intended for emergency shelter overnight and for day use. It is well-stocked with firewood and also holds emergency supplies of dried food.  The food supplies are stocked by goodwill of hikers and are not maintained officially by the National Parks.

See also
 Daveys Hut

References

Snowy Mountains
Mountain huts in Australia
Kosciuszko National Park